Peremyshl may refer to:
Peremyshl, Russia, a village in Kaluga Oblast, Russia
Peremyshl, Muscovy, a former town of Muscovy

See also
Przemyśl